Reconnaissance, surveillance, and target acquisition may refer to:
 Reconnaissance, surveillance, and target acquisition (United States), a type of unit in the United States Army
 ISTAR, a practice that links several battlefield functions to assist a combat force in gathering and managing information
 STA sniper (USMC), a surveillance and target acquisition unit of the United States Marine Corps
 Surveillance and Target Acquisition, a broader, international use of the terminology